Halla Bouksani (born 30 July 2000) is an Algerian badminton player who made her International debut in 2013 and is a National team member since 2009.

Achievements

African Championships 
Women's doubles

African Youth Games 
Girls' singles

Girls' doubles

African Junior Championships 
Girls' singles

BWF International 
Women's singles

Women's doubles

  BWF International Challenge tournament
  BWF International Series tournament
  BWF Future Series tournament

BWF Junior International 
Girls' singles

Girls' doubles

  BWF Junior International Grand Prix tournament
  BWF Junior International Challenge tournament
  BWF Junior International Series tournament
  BWF Junior Future Series tournament

References 

Living people
2000 births
Algerian female badminton players
Competitors at the 2019 African Games
African Games silver medalists for Algeria
African Games medalists in badminton
Competitors at the 2022 Mediterranean Games
Mediterranean Games competitors for Algeria
21st-century Algerian women